The following list of countries by coffee production catalogues sovereign states that have conducive climate and infrastructure to foster the production of coffee beans. Many of these countries maintain substantial supply-chain relations with the world's largest coffeehouse chains and enterprises. These coffeehouses play a prominent role in supporting developing economies by waging a variety of coffee wars to gain market share. Often these coffeehouse chains pay a premium above market price in order to alleviate fair trade and sustainable farming concerns. Developing countries that participate in the coffee market wield considerate influence on global coffee economics.

Main exporters by country 

According to the World Atlas, the main exporters of coffee beans as of 2019 are:

See also
Coffee production in Brazil
Coffee production in China
Coffee production in Colombia
Coffee production in Ethiopia
Coffee production in Guatemala
Coffee production in Hawaii
Coffee production in Kenya
Coffee production in Mexico
Coffee production in Papua New Guinea
Coffee production in the Philippines
Coffee wars
List of coffeehouse chains

References

 
Coffee